The Irish Setter (literally "red setter") is a setter, a breed of gundog, and family dog. The term Irish Setter is commonly used to encompass the show-bred dog recognised by the American Kennel Club as well as the field-bred Red Setter recognised by the Field Dog Stud Book.

Description

Appearance

The coat is moderately long, silky, and of a red or chestnut colour. It requires frequent brushing to maintain its condition and keep it mat-free. The undercoat is abundant in winter weather, and the top coat is fine. Their coats should also feather in places such as the tail, ears, chest, legs, and body.
Irish Setters are deep chested dogs with small waists. An Irish Setter's life expectancy tends to be around 11 to 12 years.

Temperament

Irish Setters get along well with children and other dogs and will greet visitors enthusiastically.  Even though they do well with household pets, small animals may pose a problem for this breed, as they are a hunting breed.  Some Irish Setters may have problems with cats in the house, and may be too boisterous with small children.  As the FCI, ANKC and UK Standards state, the breed should be "Demonstrably affectionate."  As a result, Irish Setters make excellent companion animals and family pets.

Irish Setters are an active breed, and require long, daily walks and off-lead running in wide, open spaces.  They are, however, a breed with a tendency to 'play deaf,' so careful training on mastering the recall should be undertaken before allowing them off-lead.

Irish Setters enjoy having a job to do. Lack of activity will lead to a bored, destructive, or even hyperactive dog. This is not a breed that can be left alone in the backyard for long periods of time, nor should they be. Irish Setters thrive on constant human companionship. Irish Setters respond swiftly to positive training and are highly intelligent.

Though they are usually alert to their surroundings, Irish Setters are not well-suited as guard dogs, as they are not a naturally assertive breed.

Irish Setters are also widely used as therapy dogs in schools and hospitals. Therapy dogs are permitted in hospitals with special permission and can visit patients on the assigned floors. In schools the dogs may be used to create a calming and relaxed environment. A child may read to a dog without being corrected or judged.

History
 
One of the first references to the 'Setter,' or setting dog, in literature can be found in Caius's De Canibus Britannicus, which was published in 1570 (with a revised version published in 1576).  Translated from the original Latin, the text reads:

It would be incorrect to assume the dog described above in any way resembles the Irish Setter (or any setter) as we know the breed today. Caius was referring to a type of setting spaniel, most likely now extinct. The description of the work undertaken by this early pillar of the breed resembles the working behaviour of modern Irish Setters. Of this early dog, Caius went on to write: "The most part of theyre skinnes are white, and if they are marcked with any spottes, they are commonly red, and somewhat great therewithall." If this is the case, it is safe to assume the solid red colouring of today's Irish Setter came about by selective breeding practices.

Further reference to setters in early literature can be found in The Country Farme by Richard Surflet and Gervase Markham, published in 1616.  They wrote: "There is also another sort of land spannyels which are called Setters."

It is clear that, by the early 18th Century, the type of dog known as the 'setter' had come into its own right. It is also clear the Irish had begun actively breeding their own type. For example, the de Freyne family of French Park began keeping detailed stud records in 1793. Other prominent landed Irish gentry also known to have been breeding setter lines at the same time include Lord Clancarty, Lord Dillon, and the Marquis of Waterford.

It was noted as early as 1845 that setters in Ireland were predominantly either red, or, according to Youatt, "...very red, or red and white, or lemon coloured, or white patched with deep chestnut." Clearly, the preference for a solid red-coloured dog was having an effect on the appearance of the typical Irish-bred setter.

The breed standard for the modern Irish Setter was first drawn up by the Irish Red Setter Club in Dublin and approved on 29 March 1886. It consisted of a 100-point scale, with a given number of points awarded for each of the dog's physical attributes. The points system was later dropped; however, aside from some minor changes, the standard remains largely unchanged today in most countries where the breed is formally recognised.

Uses

The Irish Setter was bred for hunting, specifically for setting or locating and pointing upland gamebirds. They are a tireless, wide-ranging hunter, and well-suited to fields and wet or dry moorland terrain. Using their excellent sense of smell to locate the mark (or bird), the Irish Setter will then hold a pointing position, indicating the direction in which the bird lies hidden.

The Irish Setter was brought to the United States in the early 19th century.

In 1874, the American Field put together the Field Dog Stud Book and registry of dogs in the United States was born. This Field Dog Stud Book is the oldest pure-bred registry in the United States. At that time, dogs could be registered even when bred from sires and dams of different breeds. At about this time, the Llewellin Setter was bred using blood lines from the Lavarack breeding of English Setter and, among other breeds, bloodlines from native Irish Setters. Around the same time, the red Irish Setter became a favourite in the dog show ring.

Not all Irish Setters of the late 19th century were red, the American Kennel Club registered Irish Setters in a myriad of colours. Frank Forester, a 19th-century sports writer, described the Irish Setter as follows: "The points of the Irish Setter are more bony, angular, and wiry frame, a longer head, a less silky and straighter coat that those of the English. His colour ought to be a deep orange-red and white, a common mark is a stripe of white between the eyes and a white ring around the neck, white stockings, and a white tage to the tail."

The Setter that was completely red, however, was preferred in the show ring and that is the direction that the breed took. Between 1874 and 1948, the breed produced 760 conformation show champions, but only five field champions.

In the 1940s, Field and Stream magazine put into writing what was already a well-known fact. The Irish Setter was disappearing from the field and an outcross would be necessary to resurrect the breed as a working dog. Sports Afield chimed in with a similar call for an outcross. Ned LaGrande of Pennsylvania spent a small fortune purchasing examples of the last of the working Irish Setters in America and importing dogs from overseas. With the blessing of the Field Dog Stud Book, he began an outcross to red and white field champion English Setters. The National Red Setter Field Trial Club was created to test the dogs and to encourage breeding toward a dog that would successfully compete with the white setters. Thus the modern Red Setter was born and the controversy begun.

Prior to 1975, a relationship existed between the American Kennel Club and the Field Dog Stud Book in which registration with one body qualified a dog for registration with the other. In 1975 the Irish Setter Club of America petitioned the American Kennel Club to deny reciprocal registration, and the request was granted. It is claimed, by critics of the move, that the pressure was placed on the American Kennel Club by bench show enthusiasts who were unappreciative of the outcrossing efforts of the National Red Setter Field Trial Club, as well as some field trialers from the American Kennel Club after a series of losses to Field Dog Stud book red setters. Working Irish Setter kennels today field champion dogs that claim lines from both the Field Dog Stud Book and the American Kennel Club.

Working Red Setter
The modern Red Setter is smaller than its bench-bred cousin. The coat is less silky and the feathering is generally shorter. The colour is lighter, with the working dog found in russet and fawn colours. The Red Setter often has patches of white on its face and chest as the Irish Setter of old did. There have been efforts to rekindle the field abilities of the true type Irish by a handful of dedicated breeders in California and elsewhere with some success. More than a dozen American Kennel Club Dual Champion Irish Setters have been made, evidence of the dog's native ability when proper traits are selectively sought in breeding.

Health
Irish Setters tend to be a relatively healthy breed. Problems that have been noted in Irish Setters include
hip dysplasia, cancer, progressive retinal atrophy (PRA), epilepsy, entropion, hypothyroidism, hyperosteodystrophy, gastric dilatation volvulus (bloat), osteosarcoma, Von Willebrand's disease, patent ductus arteriosus, canine Leukocyte adhesion deficiency (CLAD) and celiac disease.
Irish Setters are now one of the few breeds for which genetic tests have been developed to detect the presence of both CLAD and PRA (RCD-1).

Gluten intolerance in Irish Setters is a naturally occurring genetic disorder that is the result of a single autosomal recessive locus. At around 6 months of age, Irish Setters with this condition will develop an increased immune cell presence and a decrease in absorption within the small intestine when fed a gluten containing diet. These effects lead to further damage of the small intestine as well as malnutrition and diarrhea. Irish Setters that are fed a gluten free diet have been shown to be exempt from any effects associated with gluten intolerance.

Miscellaneous
Ireland's national bus and coach operator Bus Éireann uses the Irish Setter as its corporate logo.

Notable setters

 Alex the Dog from the Stroh's beer commercials (half Irish Setter, half Golden Retriever)
 Big Red, book and movie character
 Chauncey, fictional dog of Duck Phillips in Mad Men
 Garry Owen, pet of Maine Governor Percival Proctor Baxter
 King Timahoe (1968–1979), pet of Richard Nixon, a 56th birthday gift from his White House staff in January 1969.
 Kojak, fictional dog in the Stephen King novel The Stand
 Mike, pet of US President Harry Truman
 Milord, a red Setter which was Alexander II, Tsar of Russia's favourite dog
Molly, a red setter featured in the John Dies at the End series. 
 Peggy Brown, a female Irish setter, the pet of Finnish Air Force Fighter Squadron 24 in World War II
 Plunkett, the only Irish setter depicted in George Earl's mythical painting of "A Field Trial in the Eighties"
 Shannon, pet of Beach Boy Carl Wilson, whose death became the subject of the 1976 song by a friend, Henry Gross
 T-Bone, mascot for the Pace University Setters sports teams
 Thunder, first mascot for the University of British Columbia Thunderbirds sports teams
 Seamus, owned by Mitt Romney.
 Redbeard, owned by younger Sherlock Holmes in Sherlock
 Sasha La Fleur, Charlie's love interest in All Dogs Go to Heaven 2
 Shamus, an anthropomorphic male Irish setter in Mary Poppins Returns.

See also
 Dogs portal
 List of dog breeds

References

 Fergus, Charles. Gun Dog Breeds, A Guide to Spaniels, Retrievers, and Pointing Dogs, The Lyons Press, 2002.

Further reading

External links

 
 Irish Setters UK & Ireland Website - www.irishsetter.org.uk

Dog breeds originating in Ireland
FCI breeds
Gundogs